"Dive" is a song by contemporary Christian artist Steven Curtis Chapman, released as the second single from his 1999 album Speechless. "Dive" was covered by PureNRG on their final album Graduation: The Best of pureNRG. In February 2019, a remixed country version was released as the lead single for Chapman's album Where the Bluegrass Grows.  The song features country singer Ricky Skaggs.

Personnel 
 Steven Curtis Chapman – lead and backing vocals, acoustic guitar, electric guitar, dobro, track arrangement
 Randy Pearce – electric guitar
 Adam Anders – programming, bass, track arrangement
 Will Denton – drum loops 
 Scott Sheriff – backing vocals

Charts

Critical reception
"Dive" won the Dove Award for Pop/Contemporary Recorded Song of the Year at the 31st GMA Dove Awards. It was also nominated for Song of the Year at that same event.

References

1999 singles
Steven Curtis Chapman songs
1999 songs
Sparrow Records singles
Songs written by Steven Curtis Chapman